Jishnu Dev Varma(born 15 August 1957)also called Jishnu Deb Barman, is an Indian politician from Tripura. He is formerly served as 2nd Deputy Chief Minister of the Indian state of Tripura from 2018 to 2023. Jishnu Dev Varma  was elected from the Charilam constituency in Tripura Legislative Assembly Assembly From 2018 till 2023.He is also President of Badminton Association of India.

Life and family
Jishnu Dev Varma is a member of the Tripura royal family. Jishnu Dev Varma married Sudha Devvarma and the couple has two sons, namely Pratik Kishore Dev Varma and Jaibant Dev Varma. The elder son is Pratik Dev Varma.

Politics

Varma joined the Bharatiya Janata Party in early 1990s during the Ram Janmabhoomi movement.

References 

Living people
Tripura politicians
Bharatiya Janata Party politicians from Tripura
Tripura MLAs 2018–2023
People from Bishnupur district
Deputy Chief Ministers of Tripura
State cabinet ministers of Tripura
1960 births